Cho Yong-Ho (born 15 February 1955) is a South Korean judge, serving as a Justice of the Constitutional Court of Korea from April 2013 to April 2019.

Career 
1983: Judge, Daejeon District Court
1986: Judge, Seosan Branch of Daejeon District Court
1989: Judge, Suwon District Court
1990: Judge, Seoul High Court
1993: Research Judge, Supreme Court
1997: Senior Judge, Uijeongbu Branch of Seoul District Court
1998: Senior Judge, Suwon District Court
1998: Senior Judge, Eastern Branch of Seoul District Court
1999: Senior Judge, Seoul Administrative Court
2002: Senior Judge, Patent Court
2004: Senior Judge, Seoul High Court
2009: Chief Judge, Chuncheon District Court
2010: Chief Judge, Seoul Southern District Court
2011: Chief Judge, Gwangju High Court
2012: Senior Judge, Seoul High Court
2013: Chief Judge, Seoul High Court
2013–present: Justice, Constitutional Court (since 19 April 2013)

References 

Living people
1955 births
South Korean judges
Justices of the Constitutional Court of Korea